David Ménard (born July 15, 1990) is a professional Canadian football defensive lineman for the BC Lions of the Canadian Football League (CFL).

University career
Ménard played CIS football with the Montreal Carabins from 2010 to 2013. He was named the QUFL Rookie of the Year in 2010.

Professional career

BC Lions
Ménard was ranked as the 13th best player in the Canadian Football League's Amateur Scouting Bureau final rankings for players eligible in the 2014 CFL Draft. He was then selected in the fourth round and 32nd overall by the BC Lions in the draft and signed with the team on May 27, 2014. He played for the Lions for six seasons and played in 94 regular season games where he had 63 defensive tackles, 17 sacks, and three forced fumbles.

Montreal Alouettes
Upon entering free agency, Ménard signed with the Montreal Alouettes on February 12, 2020. However, he did not play in 2020 due to the cancellation of the 2020 CFL season and he re-signed with the Alouettes for the 2021 season on December 15, 2020. Ménard played in all 14 regular season games and led the East Division with eight sacks, despite only starting in one game, and also had 18 defensive tackles and two forced fumbles. He was then named an East Division All-Star and won the Lew Hayman Trophy as the East Division's Most Outstanding Canadian. He became a free agent when his contract expired on February 8, 2022.

BC Lions (II)
On February 8, 2022, it was announced that Ménard had re-signed with the BC Lions.

References

External links
 BC Lions profile

1990 births
Living people
BC Lions players
Canadian football defensive linemen
French Quebecers
Montreal Alouettes players
Montreal Carabins football players
Players of Canadian football from Quebec
Sportspeople from Saguenay, Quebec